Lodovico Magni, O.F.M. Conv. (1618–1680) was a Roman Catholic prelate who served as Bishop of Acquapendente (1674–1680).

Biography
Lodovico Magni was born in 1618 in Milan and ordained a priest in the Order of Friars Minor Conventual.
On 1 Oct 1674, he was appointed during the papacy of Pope Clement X as Bishop of Acquapendente.
On 7 Oct 1674, he was consecrated bishop by Gasparo Carpegna, Cardinal-Priest of San Silvestro in Capite.
He served as Bishop of Acquapendente until his death in 1680.

While bishop, he was the principal co-consecrator of Nicola Oliva, Bishop of Cortona (1677); and Giovanni Borgoforte, Bishop of Nona (1677).

References

External links and additional sources
 (for Chronology of Bishops) 
 (for Chronology of Bishops)  

17th-century Italian Roman Catholic bishops
Bishops appointed by Pope Clement X
1618 births
1680 deaths
Conventual Franciscan bishops
Clergy from Milan